Proof of insurance (POI) is any type of documentation that a person can provide to another individual proving that the person has valid insurance with an insurance company.

The most common form of a POI is a paper card provided by the insurance company listing policy information and effective dates.

Where vehicle insurance is compulsory, many states require that a person carry proof of insurance in their automobiles or on their person while driving.  If a person is questioned by a law enforcement official, they must provide proof of insurance.  A citation is generally issued if the person cannot provide such documentation.

See also
No fault insurance

Vehicle insurance
Documents